Bromelia humilis is a plant species in the genus Bromelia. This species is native to Venezuela, Trinidad & Tobago, and the Netherlands Antilles.

References

humilis
Flora of Venezuela
Flora of the Caribbean
Plants described in 1762
Taxa named by Nikolaus Joseph von Jacquin
Flora without expected TNC conservation status